The following is a list of language disorders. A language disorder is a condition defined as a condition that limits or altogether stops natural speech. A language disorder may be neurological, physical, or psychological in origin.

List of language disorders

Bibliography 
 

 
Lists of diseases
Disability-related lists
Communication-related lists
Psychology lists